Meropleon ambifusca, or Newman's brocade, is a species of cutworm or dart moth in the family Noctuidae. It was described by Newman in 1948 and is found in North America.

The MONA or Hodges number for Meropleon ambifusca is 9428. It is listed as a species of special concern in Connecticut, and its name is given on the list as Meropleon ambifuscum.

References

 Lafontaine, J. Donald & Schmidt, B. Christian (2010). "Annotated check list of the Noctuoidea (Insecta, Lepidoptera) of North America north of Mexico". ZooKeys, vol. 40, 1-239.

Further reading

 Arnett, Ross H. (2000). American Insects: A Handbook of the Insects of America North of Mexico. CRC Press.

External links

 Butterflies and Moths of North America
 NCBI Taxonomy Browser, Meropleon ambifusca

Apameini